Conchita and the Engineer, a.k.a. Macumba, is a 1954 Brazilian-German adventure film directed by Franz Eichhorn and Hans Hinrich and starring Paul Hartmann, Vanja Orico and Robert Freitag. It was shot at the Babelsberg Studios in Berlin and on location in Brazil. The film's Brazilian title (see poster at right) translates as Conchita, Virgin of the Amazon.

Cast
 Paul Hartmann as Prof. Dahlheim
 Vanja Orico as Conchita
 Robert Freitag as Cyll Farney
 Josefin Kipper as Irene
 Herbert Hübner
 Siegfried Schürenberg
 Ary as Der Indier
 Charlott Daudert
 Oliver Hassencamp
 Henry Horman
 Gilberto Martinho
 Panos Papadopulos
 Karl-Heinz Peters

References

Bibliography 
 Goble, Alan. The Complete Index to Literary Sources in Film. Walter de Gruyter, 1999.

External links 
 

1954 films
1954 adventure films
West German films
German adventure films
Brazilian adventure films
1950s German-language films
Films directed by Hans Hinrich
Films directed by Franz Eichhorn
Films set in Brazil
Films based on German novels
Brazilian black-and-white films
German black-and-white films
1950s German films
Films shot in Brazil
Films shot at Babelsberg Studios